Cuetzala del Progreso  is one of the 81 municipalities of Guerrero in southwestern Mexico. Its municipal seat is Cuetzala del Progreso. It covers an area of 49.8 km². In 2005, its population was 9,869.

References

Municipalities of Guerrero